Hårteigen is a characteristic mountain in Vestland county, Norway. It sits on and is visible from most parts of the vast Hardangervidda plateau.  The mountain is located in the municipality of Ullensvang, and it is inside the Hardangervidda National Park.

Name
The first element is from the Old Norse word hárr which means 'grey' and the last element is related to the German verb zeigen which means 'show'. On the large and flat plateau of Hardangervidda this mountain was important for travellers to find the direction.

See also
List of mountains of Norway

References

Inselbergs of Europe
Ullensvang
Mountains of Vestland